Aayiram Roobai is 1964 Indian Tamil-language film, directed and written by K. S. Gopalakrishnan. It stars Gemini Ganesan and Savitri Ganesh. The film was released on 3 December 1964.

Plot

Cast 
 Gemini Ganesan
 Savitri Ganesh
 M. R. Radha
 C. K. Nagesh
 S. A. Ashokan
 S. V. Sahasranamam
 Kottapuli Jayaraman
 Master Babu
 Ragini
 Mohana
 Nalini
 Baby Savitri
 Veerappan
 Karikol Raju
 Gemini Balu

Soundtrack 
Music was by K. V. Mahadevan and lyrics were written by Kannadasan, A. Maruthakasi and Vaali.

Release and reception 
Aayiram Roobai was released on 3 December 1964, delayed from a 3 November (Diwali) release. On 12 December 1964, The Indian Express stated, "A crude and twisted adaptation of the Million Pound Note, Aayiram Roopai contains precious little that is commendable. The Aayiram Roopai note in the film is counterfeit, so also the entertainment it doles out". S. V. Kannan, writing for Kalki, said Savitri carried the film on her shoulders.

References

External links 
 

1960s Tamil-language films
1964 films
Films directed by K. S. Gopalakrishnan
Films scored by K. V. Mahadevan
Films with screenplays by K. S. Gopalakrishnan
Indian black-and-white films